Arthur Eugene Jenkins, Jr. (December 7, 1936 – January 28, 2009) was an American keyboardist, composer, arranger and percussionist who worked with many popular music icons such as John Lennon, Harry Belafonte, Bob Marley and Chaka Khan.

Jenkins was born in The Bronx, New York, and began playing piano at the age of 5. After studying music at Baldwin-Wallace College in Ohio, Jenkins returned to New York and began his professional career.  He played for two years at a club called Blue Moracco.  The first year was with a singer named Irene Reid and the second was with a new singer from Ohio named Nancy Wilson.

Next began a 9-year collaboration as musical director and accompanist to singer Johnny Nash, which included Nash's 1972 smash "I Can See Clearly Now".  While with Nash, Jenkins traveled to Jamaica where he also worked on recording projects with Bob Marley and Peter Tosh.

Jenkins had now become a much sought-after studio musician, and soon was the arranger for Harry Belafonte, with whom he also recorded and toured.  He worked in the same capacity for Patti Austin and Lena Horne, who were co-performers on Belafonte's tours.

Jenkins then joined Antisia Publishing (co-owned by Ralph MacDonald and William Salter), and forged a lifelong friendship and musical partnership with MacDonald, which led to more hit recordings like "The Hustle" with Van McCoy, "Where Is the Love" with Roberta Flack and Donny Hathaway and "Just The Two of Us" with Grover Washington Jr. and Bill Withers.

Jenkins was brought to the attention of John Lennon by May Pang, production coordinator for many albums by Lennon and Yoko Ono.  Pang booked Jenkins for Ono's Feeling The Space album, and Lennon, who was about to record his Mind Games album, asked Pang to retain him for that session.  Jenkins played on all subsequent Lennon albums, including Walls and Bridges (for which he was awarded an RIAA gold record), Double Fantasy and the posthumous Milk and Honey. Lennon would jokingly credit Jenkins for "all the bells and whistles" on his records.

Jenkins also worked on Broadway theatre and lent his distinctive sounds to popular commercials for McDonald's, Chemical Bank and other products. He also released two CDs of his own material, Alone With Arthur and Alone With Arthur Again.

Jenkins died unexpectedly at his Manhattan apartment, aged 73.

Discography
Jenkins began his recording career in 1965 with the Latin Soul album by The Latin Jazz Quintet, and has over a hundred credits to his name.
 For a more complete discography, check out this site : https://www.discogs.com/fr/artist/295134-Arthur-Jenkins?page=1

With Dizzy Gillespie, Sonny Rollins, Sonny Stitt
Sonny Side Up (Verve, 1957)
With Ronnie Foster
Two Headed Freap (Blue Note, 1972)
With Marlena Shaw
From the Depths of My Soul (1973)
With John Lennon
Walls and Bridges (Apple records, 1974) 
Roots: John Lennon Sings the Great Rock & Roll Hits (Adam VIII, 1975)
Rock 'n' Roll (Apple, 1975) 
Double Fantasy (Geffen, 1980) 
Milk and Honey (Geffen, 1984) 
With Yoko Ono
Feeling the Space (Apple, 1975) 
Season of Glass (Geffen, 1981) 
A Story (Rykodisc, 1997)
With Ron Carter
Anything Goes (Kudu, 1975)
With Rahsaan Roland Kirk
The Case of the 3 Sided Dream in Audio Color (1975)
Other Folks' Music (1976)
With David "Fathead" Newman
Mr. Fathead (Warner Bros., 1976)
With Chaka Khan
Chaka (Warner Bros,1978) 
Naughty - (Warner Bros, 1980) Also plays clavinet and electric piano

References

1936 births
2009 deaths
American jazz percussionists
Singer-songwriters from New York (state)
African-American songwriters
American male conductors (music)
African-American pianists
American pop pianists
American male pianists
Rhythm and blues pianists
American male organists
American soul keyboardists
American rhythm and blues singer-songwriters
Musicians from the Bronx
American session musicians
Plastic Ono Band members
Conga players
Bongo players
Triangle players
Maracas players
Tambourine players
Güiro players
Timbaleros
Jazz musicians from New York (state)
20th-century American conductors (music)
American male jazz musicians
20th-century American keyboardists
20th-century American male musicians